Aragua de Barcelona is the shire town of Aragua Municipality in Anzoátegui State in Venezuela.

Notable people
 

Denzil Romero (1938–1999), Venezuelan writer

References

Populated places in Anzoátegui
Populated places established in 1735